Stemm is an unincorporated community in Lawrence County, Indiana, in the United States.

Stemm grew around a rail yard built at that point.

References

Unincorporated communities in Lawrence County, Indiana
Unincorporated communities in Indiana